Caryophyllaeidae is a family of flatworms belonging to the order Caryophyllidea.

Genera

Genera:
 Archigetes Leuckart, 1878
 Biacetabulum Hunter, 1927
 Bialovarium Fischthal, 1953

References

Platyhelminthes